The 1910 New South Wales state election involved 90 electoral district returning one member each.

This was the first NSW election using a second ballot system. All previous elections had used a first past the post voting system, where a candidate might be elected with less than 50% of the vote especially where two or more similar candidates split the vote. Under the second ballot system, if a candidate failed to achieve at least 50% of the vote in an electorate, a run-off election would take place in the following weeks. In this election, 3 electorates proceeded to second round elections. At Durham and St Leonards the second round ballot was won by the leading candidate; however, at Hastings and Macleay the support from the Labour Party saw the independent overtake sitting Liberal Reform member to take the seat. The Labour Party fielded a candidate in every electorate, with the result that the only 3 uncontested seats, Broken Hill, Cobar and The Murray, were all held by the Labour Party.

There were 15 seats that elected a member from a different party and a further 11 seats where the member retained the seat but changed party. For a comprehensive list, see .

The election saw the final demise of the Progressive Party, with the four surviving members, Gordon McLaurin (Albury), George Briner (Raleigh), Robert Levien (Tamworth) and Robert Donaldson (Wynyard) retaining their seats having campaigned as Independent Liberals.

Election results

Albury

Alexandria

Allowrie

Annandale

Armidale

Ashburnham

Ashfield

Balmain

Bathurst

Bega

Belmore 

Edward O'Sullivan had won Belmore at the 1907 election as a Former Progressive; however, he joined the Labour Party in 1909 and died in April 1910. The by-election in May 1910 was won by Patrick Minahan (Labour) who retained the seat at the 1910 general election.

Belubula

Bingara

Blayney

Botany

Broken Hill

Burrangong

Burwood

Camden

Camperdown

Canterbury

The Castlereagh

The Clarence

The Clyde

Cobar

Cootamundra

Corowa

The Darling

Darling Harbour 

John Norton (Independent) had won the 1907 election for Darling Harbour; however, he resigned to stand as a Senator for NSW at the 1910 federal election. The by-election in April 1910 was won by John Cochran (Labour) who retained the seat at this election.

Darlinghurst

Deniliquin

Durham

The Glebe

Gloucester

Gordon

Gough

Goulburn

Granville

The Gwydir

Hartley

The Hastings and The Macleay

The Hawkesbury

Kahibah

King

The Lachlan

Lane Cove

Leichhardt

Liverpool Plains

The Macquarie

Maitland

Marrickville

Middle Harbour

Monaro

Mudgee

The Murray

The Murrumbidgee

The Namoi

Newcastle

Newtown

Northumberland

Orange

Paddington

Parramatta

Petersham

Phillip

Pyrmont

Queanbeyan 

 Granville Ryrie had won Queanbeyan at the 1907 election; however, he resigned to contest the seat of Werriwa  at the 1910 federal election. The by-election in April 1910 was won by John Cusack (Labour) who retained the seat at the 1910 general election.

Raleigh

Randwick

Redfern

The Richmond

Rous

Rozelle

St George

St Leonards

Sherbrooke

Singleton

Sturt

Surry Hills

Tamworth

Tenterfield

The Upper Hunter

Waratah

Waverley

Wickham

Wollondilly

Wollongong

Woollahra

Wynyard

Yass

See also 

 Candidates of the 1910 New South Wales state election
 Members of the New South Wales Legislative Assembly, 1910–1913

Notes

References 

1910